George Tadlowe (by 1505 – 1557), of London, was an English politician.

Tadlowe was a Member of Parliament for Petersfield in 1547, Guildford in April 1554, Grampound in November 1554 and Camelford in 1555.

See also
Parliament of England

References

1557 deaths
Politicians from London
Year of birth uncertain
English MPs 1547–1552
English MPs 1554
English MPs 1554–1555
English MPs 1555
Members of the pre-1707 English Parliament for constituencies in Cornwall